Randy Newman's Faust is a 1995 musical by American musician and songwriter Randy Newman, who based the work on the classic story of Faust, borrowing elements from the version by Goethe, as well as Milton's Paradise Lost, but updating the story to the modern day, and infusing it with humorous cynicism.

In this retelling, God and the Devil fight for the soul of Henry Faust, a student at the University of Notre Dame.

The musical was performed at the La Jolla Playhouse in San Diego in September 1995, and the Goodman Theatre in Chicago in Sept 1996, as well as released as a CD as a concept album.

In July 2014, a stripped-down, modernized "concert" version was staged for Encores! at New York City Center.

Musical numbers 

 Act I
 "Glory Train" - God, Devil, Company
 "Can't Keep a Good Man Down" - Devil
 "How Great Our Lord" - God, Company
 "Northern Boy" - God, Devil
 "Bless the Children of the World" - Henry Faust
 "The Man" - Henry Faust, Devil
 "Little Island" - Angel Rick
 "Relax, Enjoy Yourself" - God, Devil, Child, Company

 Act II
 "Gainesville" - Margaret
 "Life Has Been Good to Me" - Martha
 "I Gotta Be Your Man" - Devil, Company
 "Feels Like Home" - Martha
 "Bleeding All Over the Place" - Devil, Martha
 "My Hero" - Margaret
 "Sandman's Coming" - Margaret
 "Happy Ending" - Devil, Company

Background
In a 1995 New York Times piece, Newman said that he was first inspired to create a work based on Goethe's Faust in the 1970s, after a first reading of the play. However, during a 2014 staging of the show at the New York City Center, Newman said onstage that "[Goethe's] Faust, of course, is a masterpiece: I read the classic comic book, and I concur.”

Newman said he had already been a fan of works that concern Heaven (such as the 1930 Marc Connelly play Green Pastures, and the 1945 movie The Horn Blows at Midnight), and that "[i]t's such a big idea, with God and the Devil, that I thought I could put everything I knew into it and say whatever I wanted[.]" Regarding his own designs for the material, however, Newman also said that "...there's something so wise about [Goethe's Faust] that it made me want to try to destroy it, in a way," and "have all its wisdom frustrated by the nature of real human beings[.]"

In 1980, Newman wrote a few songs for the project, as well as a rough draft of a script; he then put it aside to focus on his solo career and film composing.

At one point Newman showed a script of the show to Mike Nichols, who criticized the conception of the show's "Faust" character, "Henry Faust," saying (as Newman put it), "The kid doesn’t have any arc. Nothing happens to him.” Newman later said, in 2017, "But I liked that. It makes for a gruesome evening of theater."

The song "Sandman's Coming" was recycled from an episode of the 1990 television series Cop Rock, for which Newman had written a number of songs.

Production history 
Randy Newman's Faust first had a limited run at La Jolla Playhouse in San Diego in September 1995, which coincided with the release of a concept album version, featuring a different cast and arrangements than the stage version. The stage production, directed by Michael Greif was praised for its score, but criticized for its script and characters.

The script was rewritten by David Mamet for the second production, in Chicago's Goodman Theatre. This production, featuring the same principal cast, suffered similar criticisms that its script was still not the equal of its score. It ran from September 30 to November 2, 1996.

On July 1, 2014, New York City Center's Encores! staged a one-night-only performance of the show. This version was stripped down for a more minimal "concert" presentation and heavily rewritten. As on the album (but unlike earlier stage versions), Newman himself assumed the role of Lucifer, alongside a new cast that included Isiah Johnson, Tony Vincent, Laura Osnes, and Vonda Shepard.

Critical reception 

In a contemporary review for Playboy, music critic Robert Christgau found the album's vivid songs and musical comedy settings ideal for Newman's "high-spirited cynicism": "Musical comedy is the perfect medium for his unique synthesis of soundtrack grandeur, blues-savvy studio rock, and general Americana." He named it the fifth best album of the year. However, Faust only finished 87th in the voting for the Pazz & Jop, an annual critics poll run by The Village Voice. Al Weisel of Rolling Stone was critical of songs like "Little Island" and "Northern Boy", which he felt deviate from the storyline, although he called the album "the best work in years for all involved".

"Life Has Been Good to Me" was performed by French Stewart as Harry Solomon on 1997's "A Nightmare on Dick Street," an episode of NBC's 3rd Rock from the Sun. "Relax, Enjoy Yourself" and "Can't Keep a Good Man Down" were performed by two different cast groups in "Ally McBeal: The Musical, Almost", the 2000 third-season finale of Ally McBeal.

The music for "Glory Train" was partially re-used by Newman in the 2017 song "The Great Debate", from his solo album Dark Matter.

Album cast 
 Mephistopheles: Randy Newman
 Lord: James Taylor
 Henry Faust: Don Henley
 Angel Rick: Elton John
 Margaret: Linda Ronstadt
 Martha: Bonnie Raitt

Album track listing

Personnel

Randy Newman - vocals, piano
James Taylor - vocals
Elton John - vocals
Linda Ronstadt - vocals
Don Henley - vocals
Bonnie Raitt - vocals
Bob Mann - guitar
Michael Landau - guitar
Michael Thompson - guitar
Ry Cooder - guitar
Mark Goldenberg - guitar
John Gaux - guitar
Doug Livingston - pedal steel
Steve Tavaglione - saxophone
Bill Payne - Hammond B-3 organ
Benmont Tench - Hammond B-3 organ
Randy Waldman - synthesizer
Robbie Buchanan - synthesizer
Randy Kerber - synthesizer
Jimmy Johnson - bass
James Hutchinson - bass
Larry Klein - bass
Leland Sklar - bass
Carlos Vega - drums
Danny Carmassi - drums
Kenny Aronoff - drums
Jim Keltner - drums
Michael Fisher - percussion
Waddy Wachtel - guitar

References

1995 musicals
1995 albums
Music based on Goethe's Faust
Rock operas
Concept albums
Albums produced by Peter Asher
Randy Newman albums
Reprise Records albums